Tanya Georgieva Dimitrova (later Todorova, born March 15, 1957) is a Bulgarian former volleyball player who competed in the 1980 Summer Olympics.

She was born in Pernik.

In 1980 she was part of the Bulgarian team which won the bronze medal in the Olympic tournament. She played three matches.

External links
profile

1957 births
Living people
Bulgarian women's volleyball players
Olympic volleyball players of Bulgaria
Volleyball players at the 1980 Summer Olympics
Olympic bronze medalists for Bulgaria
Olympic medalists in volleyball
Medalists at the 1980 Summer Olympics
People from Pernik